Elliot Harvey Atkin (18 December 1942 – 18 July 2017) was a Canadian actor best known for his roles as Morty Melnick in Meatballs, Sergeant Ronald Coleman in Cagney & Lacey, and for voicing King Koopa in The Super Mario Bros. Super Show! and Sam in The Adventures of Sam & Max: Freelance Police.

Early life
Atkin was born 18 December 1942 in Toronto, Ontario to parents of Russian-Jewish descent. He developed his interest in acting while a student at Northview Heights Secondary School by performing in a high school production of Eugene O'Neill's one-act play The Rope, for which he won an award at the Simpson's Drama Festival. Atkin initially worked at his father's construction company. He then became a real estate agent, eventually transitioning to acting in commercials.

Career
Atkin played Morty Melnick in the comedy film Meatballs (1979), for which performance he earned a Genie nomination.

Atkin had a role in William Fruet's horror film Funeral Home (1980), as well as the role of Sam in The Adventures of Sam & Max: Freelance Police, and also played Mario's and Luigi's archenemy King Koopa on DiC Entertainment's cartoon version of Super Mario Bros. (notably, he was the first English voice actor for the character). Playing Koopa in all three Mario animated series, he was the only voice actor to appear in all three series as the same character.

He voiced Mr. Mushnik on Little Shop, loosely based on the movie Little Shop of Horrors. He also played characters in other series such as Beetlejuice, Bad Dog and Ruby Gloom. Atkin appeared in more than 75 films and on many television series. He did voice-over work in approximately 3,000 television and radio commercials, notably for the Leon's Furniture chain, for which he won three Clio Awards.

He appeared in 95 episodes of Cagney & Lacey as Sergeant Ronald Coleman. Atkin played Judge Alan Ridenour in a recurring role on the television drama Law & Order: Special Victims Unit, a role he also played in Law & Order: Criminal Intent and Law & Order, and was the voice-over in Leon's and "Buy Israel Bonds" commercials in Canada. He also made a cameo playing a bus driver in the classic film Atlantic City (1980) starring Burt Lancaster, and was the voice for Morty in the television series Jacob Two-Two. He made a guest appearance in 2010 as a rabbi on the CBC Television series 18 to Life.

Personal life
Atkin married Celia Tessler in 1963. Together they had two children, and went on to become grandparents to five.

Death
Atkin died of a brain tumor on 18 July 2017 in Toronto, Ontario, at the age of 74.

Legacy
A re-animated version of the Super Mario World episode "Mama Luigi", commissioned and directed by animation artist Andrew Dickman within a year with over 227 animators and artists participating, was dedicated to Atkin alongside Tony Rosato (Luigi) who died earlier that year on 10 January. The video was released on 29 August 2017.

Filmography

References

External links 
 

1942 births
2017 deaths
20th-century Canadian male actors
21st-century Canadian male actors
Canadian male film actors
Canadian male television actors
Canadian male voice actors
Canadian people of Russian-Jewish descent
Jewish Canadian male actors
Male actors from Toronto
Deaths from brain cancer in Canada